"Dazzle" is a song by the English post-punk band Siouxsie and the Banshees. It was released on 25 May 1984 by Polydor Records as the second single from their sixth studio album, Hyæna.

Content 
The song begins with a gradual fade-in of an orchestral string section and progresses to a drum-driven, majestic anthem. The lyrics "swallowing diamonds/A cutting throat" were derived from the final scene of Marathon Man where Laurence Olivier puts diamonds in his mouth. Siouxsie's vocals are accentuated by expansive reverb effects.

The string section piece that opens the track was actually called "Baby Piano" (a rough piano demo and the finished string section version were both included as bonus tracks on the 2009 reissue of Hyæna). The strings arrangements were scored by Martin McCarrick who would become an official member of the Banshees in 1987. A section of the London Symphonic Orchestra then recorded it.

Release 
"Dazzle" was released in a shorter and slightly different radio edit version on 25 May 1984 by Polydor Records as the second single from the band's sixth studio album, Hyæna. It climbed to number 33 on the UK Singles Chart and was Siouxsie and the Banshees' 11th top 40 UK hit.

References 

1984 singles
Siouxsie and the Banshees songs
Song recordings produced by Mike Hedges
1984 songs
Polydor Records singles
Songs written by Siouxsie Sioux
Songs written by Budgie (musician)
Songs written by Steven Severin
Songs written by Robert Smith (musician)